Cai Huichao is a Chinese Paralympic powerlifter with cerebral palsy. He represented China at the 2008 Summer Paralympics, at the 2012 Summer Paralympics and at the 2016 Summer Paralympics and he won two medals: the gold medal in the men's 90 kg event in 2008 and the silver medal in the men's 90 kg event in 2012.

At the 2010 Asian Para Games held in Guangzhou, China, he won the gold medal in the men's 90 kg event.

References

External links 
 

Living people
Chinese powerlifters
Male powerlifters
Paralympic powerlifters of China
Paralympic gold medalists for China
Paralympic silver medalists for China
Paralympic medalists in powerlifting
Powerlifters at the 2008 Summer Paralympics
Powerlifters at the 2012 Summer Paralympics
Powerlifters at the 2016 Summer Paralympics
Medalists at the 2008 Summer Paralympics
Medalists at the 2012 Summer Paralympics
Sportspeople with cerebral palsy
Year of birth missing (living people)
Sportspeople from Shanghai
21st-century Chinese people